James Mould may refer to:

 James Mould (politician) (1870–1944), politician in Alberta, Canada
 James Mould (lawyer) (1893–1958), English barrister